Trần Anh Khoa (born 28 July 1991) is a Vietnamese former footballer who played as an attacking midfielder for V-League club SHB Đà Nẵng.

Club career

Quế Ngọc Hải incident 
In a match of 2015 V.League 1 on 13 September 2015 between SHB Đà Nẵng and Sông Lam Nghệ An, Anh Khoa was dribbling into the box at the 21st minute when Quế Ngọc Hải, committed a dangerous and reckless tackle to stop him. Ngọc Hải was only shown a yellow card by the referee but Anh Khoa had to be substituted and suffered serious injury to his knee ligaments and leg bone because of the tackle. Ngọc Hải was later suspended for 6 months for all football related activities, and was ordered to pay the roughly 800 million đồng for Anh Khoa's medical expenses. Anh Khoa was expected to remain injured for 12 to 18 months and had to travel to Singapore for surgery. Doctors said that there was only a 50% chance of Anh Khoa recovering enough to play professional football again. After many operations, he retired from professional football in 2017.

References 

1988 births
Living people
Vietnamese footballers
Association football midfielders
V.League 1 players
SHB Da Nang FC players